The 2004 Arizona Wildcats baseball team represented the University of Arizona in the 2004 NCAA Division I baseball season. The Wildcats played their home games at Jerry Kindall Field at Frank Sancet Stadium. The team was coached by Andy Lopez in his 3rd year at Arizona.

The Wildcats won the South Bend Regional and then Long Beach Super Regional to advanced to the College World Series, where they were defeated by the Georgia Bulldogs.

Personnel

Roster

Coaches

Opening day

Schedule and results

Tucson Regional

Tucson Super Regional

College World Series

Awards and honors 
Jason Donald
 Second Team Freshman All-American Baseball America
 First Team Freshman All-American Collegiate Baseball

Trevor Crowe
 First Team All-Pac-10
 College World Series All-Tournament Team

2004 MLB draft

References 

Arizona Wildcats baseball seasons
Arizona Wildcats baseball
College World Series seasons
Arizona